Miločaj is a village situated in Kraljevo municipality in Serbia.

Famous singer Lepa Lukić was born in this village.

References

Populated places in Raška District